Witold Pruszkowski (14 January 1846, Bershad - 10 October 1896, Budapest) was a Polish painter and graphic artist in the Symbolist style.

Biography
He spent his childhood in Odessa and Kiev. The family emigrated to Dieppe in 1860, and he relocated to Paris in 1866, where he had his first drawing lessons with the portrait painter, Tadeusz Gorecki, the son-in-law of Adam Mickiewicz. From 1869 to 1872, he studied at the Academy of Fine Arts, Munich with Alexander von Wagner then, from 1872 to 1875, at the Kraków Academy of Fine Arts with Jan Matejko.

In 1882, he settled in Mników. Over the next few years, he and his brother travelled to Algeria, Tunisia and Italy. He also held several exhibitions in Warsaw and Lwów. Later, he exhibited internationally, including shows in San Francisco and Chicago. In 1892, he became a member of the construction committee for a monument to Artur Grottger.

He was ill for several years before his death. While visiting with family in Kołomyja, he suddenly disappeared. He was found at the train station in Budapest, suffering from extreme exhaustion, and was taken to a hospital, where he died two days later.

Although he painted portraits and rural scenes, he is best known for his depictions of fairy tales and folklore; working in pastels as well as oils. He also drew inspiration from the works of Juliusz Słowacki and Zygmunt Krasiński. His most familiar work is, perhaps, "March to Siberia", painted in 1893. Its whereabouts were unknown for many years, but it was found in a private collection after World War II and is now in the Lviv National Art Gallery.

Selected paintings

References

Further reading
 Dorota Suchocka, Witold Pruszkowski: katalog wystawy monograficznej (exhibition catalog), Polish National Museum, 1992

External links 

 ArtNet: More works by Pruszkowski.

19th-century Polish painters
19th-century Polish male artists
Polish draughtsmen
1846 births
1896 deaths
People from Bershad
Polish portrait painters
Symbolism (arts)
Polish male painters